Grand Duke Vladimir Kirillovich of Russia (21 April 1992) was the Head of the Imperial Family of Russia, a position which he claimed from 1938 to his death.

Early life
Vladimir was born Prince Vladimir Kirillovich of Russia at Porvoo in the Grand Duchy of Finland, the only son of Grand Duke Cyril Vladimirovich and Grand Duchess Viktoria Feodorovna (née Princess Victoria Melita of Saxe-Coburg and Gotha). Vladimir's paternal grandparents were Grand Duke Vladimir Alexandrovich of Russia and Grand Duchess Maria Pavlovna (née Duchess Marie of Mecklenburg-Schwerin). His maternal grandparents were Alfred, Duke of Saxe-Coburg and Gotha and Grand Duchess Marie Alexandrovna of Russia.

Vladimir's family had fled to Finland after the Russian Revolution of 1917. His family left Finland in 1920, moving to Coburg, Germany. On 8 August 1922 Vladimir's father declared himself Curator of the Russian throne. Two years later on 31 August 1924 his father went a step further and assumed the title Emperor and Autocrat of all the Russias. With his father's assumption of the Imperial title Vladimir was granted the title of Tsesarevich (heir apparent) and Grand Duke with the style of Imperial Highness. In 1930 his family left Germany for Saint-Briac, France where his father set up his court.

In the 1930s Vladimir lived for a period in England studying at the University of London and working at the Blackstone agricultural equipment factory in Lincolnshire. He later returned to France moving to Brittany where he became a landowner.

Russian heir and World War II

On the death of his father on 12 October 1938, Vladimir assumed the Headship of the Imperial Family of Russia. In 1938 there were suggestions that he would be made regent of Ukraine but he rebuffed the idea, saying he would not help dissolve Russia.

During World War II, Vladimir was living in Saint-Briac-sur-Mer in Brittany. On June 26, 1941, he issued this statement: "In this grave hour, when Germany and almost all the nations of Europe have declared a crusade against Communism and Bolshevism, which has enslaved and oppressed the people of Russia for twenty-four years, I turn to all the faithful and loyal sons of our Homeland with this appeal: Do what you can, to the best of your ability, to bring down the Bolshevik regime and to liberate our Homeland from the terrible yoke of Communism." In 1942, Vladimir and his entourage were placed in a concentration camp at Compiègne after he refused to issue a manifesto calling on Russian émigrés to support Nazi Germany's war against the Soviet Union.

In 1944 the German army moved the family inland out of fear of an invasion from the coast. The Germans were taking them to Paris when an order to drive to Vittel was given. Even Vittel proved to be unsafe, so they were moved to Germany. Vladimir lived in a castle belonging to the husband of his elder sister Maria Kirillovna in Amorbach, Bavaria until 1945. After Germany's defeat, Vladimir's fear of being captured by the Soviets prompted relocation to Austria and next to the border of Liechtenstein. He tried to move with General Boris Smyslovsky's army and cross the border, but neither Liechtenstein nor Switzerland would issue him an exit visa, so he stayed in Austria where he lived in the American occupation zone.

Vladimir's maternal aunt, Infanta Beatrice of Orléans-Borbon, secured for him a Spanish visa. He subsequently lived with her in Sanlúcar de Barrameda.

Post war and marriage
After the war he spent most of his time in Madrid, with frequent stays at his property in Brittany, as well as in Paris.

Vladimir married Princess Leonida Georgievna Bagration-Moukhransky on 13 August 1948 in Lausanne. Pre-revolutionary Romanov house law dictated that only those born of an "equal marriage" between a Romanov dynast and a member of a "royal or sovereign house", were included in the Imperial line of succession to the Russian throne; children of morganatic marriages were ineligible to inherit the throne or dynastic status. The family to which Princess Leonida belonged, the Bagrationi dynasty, had been kings in Georgia from the medieval era until the early 19th century, but no male line ancestor of hers had reigned as a king in Georgia since 1505 and her branch of the Bagrations, the House of Mukhrani, had been naturalised among the non-ruling nobility of Russia after Georgia was annexed to the Russian empire in 1801. Yet the royal status of the House of Bagration had been recognized by Russia in the 1783 Treaty of Georgievsk and was confirmed by Vladimir Kirillovich on 5 December 1946 as claimed head of the Russian imperial house. However the last ruling emperor of Imperial Russia Nicholas II had deemed marriage in this family of Princess Tatiana Constantinova in 1911, as morganatic. Some controversy therefore arises as to whether Vladimir's marriage to Leonida was equal or morganatic, and whether his claim to the Imperial throne validly passed to his daughter Maria, to some other dynast, or to no one upon his death.

Following Vladimir's public designation of his daughter as "curatrix of the throne", in anticipation that she would eventually succeed him as head of the dynasty in exile, the heads of three of the other branches of the imperial family—the Princes Vsevolod Ioannovich (Konstantinovichi), Roman Petrovich (Nikolaevichi) and Andrei Alexandrovich (Mihailovichi) -- wrote to Vladimir in 1969, asserting that the dynastic status of his daughter was no different from that of their own children (Vsevolod Ioannovich was childless, but Roman Petrovich had two sons by Countess Prascovia Sheremetyev, while Andrei Alexandrovich had two sons by Donna Elisabeth Ruffo of a Russian branch of the Princes di San Sant' Antimo) and that his wife was of no higher status than the wives of the other Romanov princes.

In 1952 he called on the Western powers to wage war against the Soviet Union. On 23 December 1969 Vladimir issued a controversial decree whereby in the event he predeceased the living male Romanovs that he recognised as dynasts then his daughter Maria would become the "Curatrix of the Imperial Throne". This has been viewed as an attempt by Vladimir to ensure the succession remained in his branch of the imperial family, while the heads of the other branches declared that Vladimir's actions were illegal.

Vladimir was able to visit Russia in November 1991 when he was invited to visit St Petersburg by its Mayor Anatoly Sobchak.

Death and succession dispute

Grand Duke Vladimir died while addressing a gathering of Spanish-speaking bankers and investors in Northern Trust Bank Miami in the United States on 21 April 1992. His body was returned to Russia and he was buried with full pomp and splendour in the Peter and Paul Fortress in St. Petersburg, the first Romanov to be honoured in this way since before the revolution. The press noted that the funeral "was regarded by civic and Russian authorities as an obligation to the Romanov family rather than a step toward restoration of the monarchy." As he was only a great-grandson of a recognized Russian emperor, his claimed title of "Grand Duke of Russia" caused problems as to what to put on his tombstone.

After his death, his daughter Maria Vladimirovna assumed the headship of the Imperial Family of Russia according to his branch's interpretation of the Russian house laws. This was disputed by Nicholas Romanov, Prince of Russia who had been chosen president of the self-styled "Romanov Family Association" prior to the death of Grand Duke Vladimir.

Ancestry

References

Bibliography

External links

 

|-

|-

1917 births
1992 deaths
20th-century Russian people
House of Holstein-Gottorp-Romanov
Pretenders to the Russian throne
Recipients of the Order of the White Eagle (Russia)
Recipients of the Order of St. George of the First Degree
Recipients of the Order of St. Vladimir, 1st class
Recipients of the Order of St. Anna, 1st class
Recipients of the Order of Saint Stanislaus (Russian), 1st class
Bailiffs Grand Cross of Honour and Devotion of the Sovereign Military Order of Malta
Anti-communists from the Russian Empire
Alumni of the University of London
20th-century Eastern Orthodox Christians
People from Porvoo
White Russian emigrants to Finland
White Russian emigrants to Germany
White Russian emigrants to France
White Russian emigrants to Spain
People from the Russian Empire of British descent
People from the Russian Empire of German descent
House of Romanov in exile
Tsesarevichs of Russia
Russian monarchists
Burials at Saints Peter and Paul Cathedral, Saint Petersburg